The albums discography of American country artist Barbara Mandrell contains 25 solo studio albums, two collaborative studio albums, 20 compilation albums, one live album and six other album appearances. In 1971, Mandrell's debut studio record was released on Columbia Records titled Treat Him Right. It was her first disc to chart on America's Billboard country albums chart, reaching number 44. In 1972, she collaborated with David Houston on the album A Perfect Match. Mandrell's third studio album The Midnight Oil (1973) was her first to reach the top ten of the country albums chart, climbing to number six. In 1976, she moved to ABC Records and released three more studio projects that reached the top 40 of the Billboard country LP's survey. 

Mandrell switched to MCA in 1978 and released Moods. It was her second top ten album on the Billboard country albums chart, climbing to number eight. It was also her first disc to chart on the Billboard 200 and the top five of Canada's RPM country albums chart. Her next several studio albums also reached the top ten of the American and Canadian country charts including Just for the Record (1979), Love Is Fair (1980), ...In Black & White (1982), Spun Gold (1983), Clean Cut (1984) and a collaboration with Lee Greenwood. In 1981, MCA released Mandrell's first live project which was certified gold in sales by the Recording Industry Association of America. During this period her compilation The Best of Barbara Mandrell also certified gold from the RIAA. 

In 1987, Mandrell signed with Capitol Records and released Sure Feels Good the same year. It was followed in 1989 by I'll Be Your Jukebox Tonight which reached the top 40 of the Billboard country albums survey. She remained on the Capitol roster until 1991 and released three more album projects with the label. Her final disc with Capitol was 1991's Key's in the Mailbox. She moved to independent projects during the remainder of the decade. Mandrell's final album was released in 1994 titled It Works for Me.

Studio albums

As lead artist

As a collaborative artist

Compilation albums

Live albums

Other appearances

References

External links 
 Discography at her official website

Country music discographies
Discographies of American artists